Dossenus is a genus of spiders in the family Trechaleidae. It was first described in 1898 by Simon. , it contains 3 species.

Etymology

Dossenus was a monster from Roman theatre. It was a hybrid of human and animal and was portrayed as one who would eat and chomp its way through anything. The name Dossenus roughly translates to "ever-chomping" in English.

References

Trechaleidae
Araneomorphae genera
Spiders of Central America
Spiders of South America